Leonardo Semião Granado (born 10 May 1994 in Assis, São Paulo) is a Brazilian footballer who currently plays as a forward for FBC Gravina in the Italian Serie D.

Career

FK Kukësi
He left Club Destroyers and joined Albanian Superliga side FK Kukësi in June during their preseason training camp in Austria, ahead of the Europa League first qualifying round. He missed out on the tie against Belarusian side FC Torpedo-BelAZ Zhodino in the first qualifying round due to his paperwork not going through in time, but he was able to be selected for the second qualifying round

References

External links

Leonardo Semião Granado at ZeroZero

1994 births
Living people
Brazilian footballers
Brazilian expatriate footballers
São Carlos Futebol Clube players
Clube Atlético Juventus players
Club Destroyers players
FK Kukësi players
Bhayangkara F.C. players
Victoria Hotspurs F.C. players
A.C.R. Messina players
KF Bylis Ballsh players
Club Rubio Ñu footballers
Serie D players
Kategoria e Parë players
Association football forwards
Brazilian expatriate sportspeople in Bolivia
Brazilian expatriate sportspeople in Albania
Brazilian expatriate sportspeople in Malta
Brazilian expatriate sportspeople in Indonesia
Brazilian expatriate sportspeople in Italy
Brazilian expatriate sportspeople in Myanmar
Brazilian expatriate sportspeople in Paraguay
Expatriate footballers in Bolivia
Expatriate footballers in Albania
Expatriate footballers in Malta
Expatriate footballers in Indonesia
Expatriate footballers in Italy
Expatriate footballers in Myanmar
Expatriate footballers in Paraguay
Southern Myanmar F.C. players
Footballers from São Paulo (state)
People from Assis